The 1898 Grand National was the 60th renewal of the Grand National horse race that took place at Aintree near Liverpool, England, on 25 March 1898.

Finishing Order

Non-finishers

References

 1898
Grand National
Grand National
19th century in Lancashire